Mudman or Mud-man may refer to:
 Golem, a folkloric being that is often made from mud

Characters
 Mud-man (Dungeons & Dragons), a monster in the role-playing game Dungeons & Dragons
 Mudman, a character in the World Heroes series of games
 Mudman, a character in the My Hero Academia series
 Mudman, a character in the Atomic Puppet series of games
 Mudman, the titular character in a comic by Paul Grist

Other uses
 Kim Jones (artist) (born 1944), an American performance artist also known as Mudman
 Casio G-Shock Mudman, a watch

See also
Creation of man from clay
Mudmen (disambiguation)